Glastonbury Cricket Club is an English amateur cricket club based in Glastonbury, Somerset. The club's first team plays in the West of England Premier League which is an accredited ECB Premier League, the highest level for recreational club cricket in England and Wales.

History
The first record of a cricket club representing Glastonbury is from 1893, when they played host to Weston-super-Mare at the Morlands Athletic Ground, Glastonbury.  The home side won by seven wickets with a match-winning performance by 'R Laver', who claimed six Weston-super-Mare wickets, and then top-scored for Glastonbury in their reply with 54. Laver continued to star for Glastonbury in the three recorded matches from 1894, taking seven wickets against Wells, six against Yeovil, and five against Bridgwater. He claimed five wickets again in 1899, their next recorded match, against Wincanton.

In 1986, the Morlands Athletic Ground was renamed the Tor Leisure Ground.  Glastonbury played in the Somerset League from at least 1990 until 2002, when they were divisional champions, earning promotion to the Bristol & Somerset Division. They won this division at the first attempt in 2003.  Despite finishing with fewer points than Midsomer Norton, they had a higher average number of points due to having one more match cancelled. Playing in Premier Two in 2004, Glastonbury finished top of their league for the third successive season, gaining promotion to the West of England Premier League Premier One division.

Honours
West of England Premier League - Premier One
Runners-Up: 2005, 2008
West of England Premier League — Premier Two
Champions: 2004
West of England Premier League — Bristol & Somerset Division
Champions: 2003
West of England Premier League — Somerset Division
Champions: 2002
 Somerset Major Cup
Champions: 2006, 2007, 2013
Runners-Up: 2008, 2009

Players

Current squad

List of professional former players
Jos Buttler (Lancashire)Craig Kieswetter (Somerset)Rory Hamilton-Brown (Sussex)Ben Duckett (Northamptonshire)Wes Durston (Derbyshire)James Hildreth (Somerset)Cameron Steel (Middlesex)Gareth Andrews (Worcestershire)

Records & Statistics

Team records

Played: 312 
Wins: 176 
Loses: 106 
No Result/Abandoned: 30

Batting

Most runs: 4,485 – Wes Durston
Best average: 54.04 – Wes Durston
Highest individual score: 214 – Wes Durston
Most fifties: 21 – Wes Durston
Most centuries: 13 – Wes Durston

Bowling

Most wickets: 266 – Robert Travers
Best average: 9.13 – Christopher Slocombe
Best bowling: 8/71 – Andrew Barron
Best strike rate: 18.34 – Wes Durston
Best economy rate: 2.54 – David Beal

Fielding

Most catches (Outfield): 77 – Steven Spencer
Most catches(Wicket-Keeping): 57 – Justin Lisk
Most stumpings: 25 – Justin Lisk
Most run outs:  12 – Steven Spencer

All statistics & records as of 23 March 2014.

Club officials

Committee
 Patron: Joel Garner
 Chairman: Heather Hall
 Honorary Treasurer: Stephanie Berry
 Honorary Secretary: Gabrielle Owen	
Advisor: Steve Dickens
Club Captain: Stephen Keates
Head Groundsman: Keith Tooze & Bob Taylor

Coaching staff
 Director of Cricket: David Beal
 1st team coach: Andy Gibbens
 1st team captain: Matt Shawcross
 2nd team captain: Chris Herbert
 3rd team captain: Ian Odam
Under 15s team manager: David Beal
Under 13s team manager: David Gooch
Under 11s A team manager: Zoe Smeed
Under 11s B team manager: Jerry Dalton

References

External links
Glastonbury Cricket Club - Play-Cricket site

English club cricket teams
Cricket in Somerset
Glastonbury